Shaun Rogers may refer to:
 Shaun Rogers (American football) (born 1979), American football defensive tackle
 Shaun Rogers (figure skater) (born 1985), American figure skater